Azhad Harraz Arman (born 9 May 2003) is a Malaysian professional football player. He plays as a forward for Sabah in the Malaysian League.

Career

Club
Azhad made his professional debut with the FAM-MSN team in the 2021 Malaysia Premier League. He scored 8 goals in his first season. On the same season he was nominated for the best striker and best young player award at the FAM National Football Award.

On 28 November 2021, Azhad signed a 4 years contract with Sabah. He made his Malaysia Super League debut with Sabah against Melaka United on 5 April 2022 coming in as a substitute.

International
In October 2021, Azhad received his first called up to represent the Malaysia U-23 for the 2022 AFC U-23 Asian Cup qualification. He played in the last match against Thailand as Malaysia booked their placed into the final round of 2022 AFC U-23 Asian Cup.

References

External Links
Azhad Harraz - Soccerway

2003 births
Living people
Bajau people
People from Sabah
Sabah F.C. (Malaysia) players
Association football forwards
Malaysian footballers
Malaysia international footballers